Hippolyte Jean-Baptiste Garneray (1787–1858) was a French painter.

Garneray was the third son of the painter Jean-François Garneray. He was active in history painting, marine painting, engraving, landscape art and watercolour.  Garneray's works include Un perron époque Louis XIII (Musée de la Chartreuse de Douai).

References

1787 births
1858 deaths
18th-century French painters
French male painters
19th-century French painters
19th-century French male artists
18th-century French male artists